Kim Kahana, Sr. (born 1929) is an American actor, stunt performer and action choreographer of Hawaiian and Japanese descent. He has done stunts for over 300 movies and television programs and runs a stunt school in Groveland, Florida that has trained over 15,000 students.

Early life and military service
Unable to read or write, Kahana dropped out of school in third grade. At age 13 he hitchhiked across the United States by himself, sometimes stealing in order to eat. His performing career began as a knife and fire dancer in a stage show called Samoan Warriors.

Kahana served as a paratrooper in the Korean War where he was captured and shot by an enemy firing squad. Feigning death, he was left by his captors in a mass grave from which he escaped. A hand grenade explosion also rendered him sightless for two years and permanently blind in his left eye. The U.S. military awarded Kahana a Silver Star and two Bronze Star Medals, as well as two Purple Hearts for his services.

In 1955, Kahana survived a plane crash in the state of Texas that killed the other 32 people on board. Surviving this crash and his experiences in Korea imbued Kahana with a personal life philosophy of, "Maybe I'm right where I ought to be."

Film, television and stunt career
Kahana entered film after the Korean War, working as an extra, playing a motorcycle rider in 1953's The Wild One. When he saw that stunt performers were paid more than extras, he pursued a stunt career, training with Yakima Canutt and John Eppers. By the 1960s and throughout the 70s and 80s, he worked steadily as a stuntman for many films including Cool Hand Luke (1967), Planet of the Apes 1968, Che! (1969), Patton (1970), The Omega Man (1971), Joe Kidd (1972), Soylent Green (1973), Burt Reynolds' Smokey and the Bandit franchise, and the disaster films of Irwin Allen. Kahana also doubled for Charles Bronson in his films for over 20 years.

Kahana also performed and coordinated fight scenes and stunts (often uncredited) for numerous TV shows, including 28 episodes of Kung Fu, and made numerous appearances on other programs, including Mission Impossible, The Six Million Dollar Man, Vega$, Magnum, P.I., Charlie's Angels, Quincy. Fantasy Island and The Brady Bunch. Because of his size (5' 7", or 168 cm) Kahana frequently acted as stunt double for female actors, including Stefanie Powers of The Girl from U.N.C.L.E. and Sally Field on The Flying Nun.

In 1968, Kahana played a leading role in the Hanna-Barbera children's adventure serial Danger Island, a live-action serialized adventure story that appeared as part of the Banana Splits Adventure Hour. His character, Chongo, was a mute castaway from a shipwrecked merchant marine vessel who communicated only using hand signs and bird calls. As the comedic sidekick to fellow castaway Elihu Morgan (played by Rockne Tarkington), Chongo's antics prompted his friend to call out, "Uh-oh Chongo!". The catchphrase became popular with children during the following decade, and inevitably followed Kahana in his work and personal life. Because Danger Island aired weekly and Kahana worked both as an actor and as a stunt performer, he was one of the highest paid stunt people in the business.

Over his first three decades of work as a stunt performer, Kahana broke his bones more than 60 times. By the 1980s, Kahana had moved away from doing "life-threatening" stunts while still continuing to coordinate action scenes and perform his own stunt work.

Kahana has served as a member of the Stuntmen's Association of Motion Pictures and spent eight years on the Screen Actors Guild's Safety Investigative Team and the Stunt Safety Committee. He runs a production company called Stunt Action & Safety Coordinator, Inc. that runs second unit production for major motion pictures. He opened the Kahana Stunt School in 1972 to train performers in stunt work and safety, as well as how to navigate the motion picture and TV industries.

Other work
Kahana studied martial arts in Japan where he earned six black belts in karate, aikido and jujutsu. In addition to teaching stunts, he is a martial arts and hand-to-hand combat instructor and weapons expert. Kahana has also run a bodyguard agency, employing as many as 30 people at once.

Personal life
Kim Kahana had three sons (Tony, Rick, and Kim Jr.) and one daughter (Debbie), all of whom teach at Kahana's school, hold black belts in karate and have also performed in numerous blockbuster films. In 2005 Kahana Sr. married his wife Sandra, who works as the lead administrator for the stunt school.

On July 24, 2012, Kim Kahana lost his son Rick Kalua Kahana, who died at his home in Canoga Park, California.

Selected filmography
 Jeepers Creepers (2001) Actor, Stunt Player
 Matinee (1993) Stunts
 Passenger 57 (1992) Stunts
 Street Soldiers (1991) Director, Stunt Coordinator
 Revenge (1990) Stunts
 Mind Games (1989) Stunts
 Exterminator 2 (1984) Actor
 Smokey and the Bandit II (1980) Stunts
 Buck Rogers in the 25th Century (1979) Stunts
 Up (1976) Stunt Coordinator
 The Killer Elite (1975) Stunts, Actor, Advisor
 Table for Three Stunt Coordinator
 Danger Island on the Banana Splits Adventure Hour (1968–69) as Chongo

References

External links
 

1929 births
Living people
American stunt performers
American male film actors
American male actors of Japanese descent
American film actors of Asian descent
Male actors from Hawaii
Karate coaches
American male karateka
American jujutsuka
American aikidoka
United States Army personnel of the Korean War
American military personnel of Japanese descent
Recipients of the Silver Star
Survivors of aviation accidents or incidents